Odd Fellows Building may refer to:

in the United States

 Odd Fellows Building (Red Bluff, California), listed on the National Register of Historic Places (NRHP)
 Odd Fellows Building and Auditorium, Sweet Auburn, Atlanta, Georgia, NRHP-listed
 Odd Fellows Building (Inez, Kentucky)
 Odd Fellows Building (Owensboro, Kentucky), NRHP-listed
 Odd Fellows Building (Pikeville, Kentucky), NRHP-listed
 Odd Fellows Building (Malden, Massachusetts), NRHP-listed
 Odd Fellows Building (Raleigh, North Carolina), NRHP-listed
 Odd Fellows Building (Reno, Nevada), formerly NRHP-listed, but demolished and delisted
 Odd Fellows Building (Portland, Oregon), NRHP-listed
 Odd Fellows Building (Gary, South Dakota), NRHP-listed
Odd Fellows Building (Casper, Wyoming), NRHP-listed

See also
List of Odd Fellows buildings
 Odd Fellows Hall (disambiguation)